Surgalm (also Romanized as Sūrgalm, Soorgalam, and Sūr Galam; also known as Sūrgūāl Māch, Surguāl Machh, and Surquāl Machh) is a village in Gabrik Rural District, in the Central District of Jask County, Hormozgan Province, Iran. At the 2006 census, its population was 437, in 78 families.

References 

Populated places in Jask County